Despot is a multi-functional armoured vehicle developed by the arms manufacturer Tehnički Remont Bratunac, which is headquartered in Bratunac, Republika Srpska, Bosnia and Herzegovina.

The vehicle can be used for police and military purposes. Its main roles are patrol and reconnaissance missions, commanding, transport and support of special operation units, medical purposes, counter-terrorism operations and peace action in cases of different weather conditions. 

A prototype was unveiled to the public on January 9, 2019 during the annual Republic Day parade in Banja Luka. The first two serially produced models were procured for the Training Center of the Ministry of Interior of Republika Srpska in Zalužani, near Banja Luka, where the vehicles will be stationed for the purposes of the Special Anti-Terrorist Unit.

Users
  – The vehicle's only user is the Republika Srpska's Special Anti-Terrorist Unit. It has been reported that countries such as Namibia, Tanzania, Israel and Russia have also expressed interest.

References

Armoured personnel carriers
Republika Srpska
Wheeled armoured fighting vehicles